Druid were a 1970s progressive rock band from England, and initially came to public attention by winning a 1974 unsigned band contest by Melody Maker magazine. The band went on to perform on The Old Grey Whistle Test and to record two albums. Their sound was notably influenced by Yes.

After the demise of Druid, Neil Brewer and Dane Stevens formed the Never Never Band with a more commercial approach.

Former member Cedric Sharpley, who went on to back Gary Numan in the band Tubeway Army, died from a heart attack on 13 March 2012. Keyboard player Andrew McCrorie-Shand later pursued a career composing for Ragdoll Productions, most notably their longest-running TV shows Rosie and Jim, while bass player Neil Brewer was the show's third and final presenter from 1997 to 2000.

Line-up
 Cedric Sharpley – drums (founding member; died 2012)
 Neil Brewer – bass (founding member)
 Dane Stevens – vocals, guitars (founding member)
 Andrew McCrorie-Shand – keyboards (joined 1974)
Pete Griffiths - keyboards (1971–73)

Discography

Toward The Sun (1975)

Side one
 "Voices" (McCrorie-Shand/Dane) - 8:13
 "Remembering" (Brewer/Dane) - 5:24
 "Theme" (Brewer/Dane/McCrorie-Shand/Sharpley) - 5:24
 "Toward The Sun" (Dane) - 5:03
Side two
 "Red Carpet For An Autumn" (Brewer/McCrorie-Shand) - 3:10
 "Dawn Of Evening" (Brewer/McCrorie-Shand) - 10:02
 "Shangri-La" (Brewer/Dane) - 10:11
Personnel
Neil Brewer – Bass Guitar
Cedric Sharpley – Drums, Percussion
Dane – Guitars, Vocals 
Andrew McCrorie-Shand – Keyboards
Bob Harris – Producer    
George Nicholson – Engineer 
 Adrian Sadgrove – Artwork

Fluid Druid (1976)

Side one
 "Razor Truth"	(Dane/Brewer) - 5:42
 "Painters Clouds" (Dane/Brewer) - 5:00 	
 "FM 145" (McCrorie-Shand) - 2:08
 "Crusade" (McCrorie-Shand/Brewer) - 7:48
Side two 	
 "Nothing But Morning" (Dane/Brewer) - 4:09 	
 "Barnaby" (Dane) - 3:12 	
 "Kestrel" (McCrorie-Shand) - 3:35	
 "Left To Find" (McCrorie-Shand/Dane/Brewer) - 7:12 	
 "The Fisherman's Friend" (McCrorie-Shand) - 0:46
Personnel
Neil Brewer – Bass Guitar
Cedric Sharpley – Drums, Percussion
Dane – Guitars, Vocals 
Andrew McCrorie-Shand – Keyboards
Druid, Paul "Rockette" Harman – Producer
Ken "Superstar" Thomas – Assistant Engineer
 The Cream Group – Artwork

Singles
Barnaby/Kestrel/Nothing But Morning (1976, EMI)

Compilations
 Toward the Sun / Fluid Druid (1995, BGO Records)

References

External links
 Neverneverband.co.uk
 Tinderfish.com

English progressive rock groups
Musical quartets